The 2005–06 Cupa României was the 68th season of the annual Romanian football knockout tournament.

The winners of the competition qualified for the first qualifying round of the 2006–07 UEFA Cup.

Round of 32
The matches took place on September 20 and 21, 2005.

|}

Round of 16
The matches took place on October 25, 2006.

|}

Quarter-finals
The matches took place on December 7, 2005.

|}

Semi-finals
The 1st leg match took place on March 22, 2006. The 2nd on April 19, 2006.

|}

Final

References
 Romanian Cup 2005/2006 (RomanianSoccer)

Romania
Cupa Romaniei, 2005-06
Cupa României seasons